The following outline is provided as an overview of and topical guide to anesthesia:

Anesthesia – pharmacologically induced and reversible state of amnesia, analgesia, loss of responsiveness, loss of skeletal muscle reflexes or decreased sympathetic nervous system, or all simultaneously. This allows patients to undergo surgery and other procedures without the distress and pain they would otherwise experience. An alternative definition is a "reversible lack of awareness," including a total lack of awareness (e.g. a general anesthetic) or a lack of awareness of a part of the body such as a spinal anesthetic.

What type of thing is anesthesia? 

Anesthesia can be described as all of the following:
 Medical procedure
 Medical specialty

Types of anesthesia 
 General 
 Spinal
 Epidural
 Local (Topical)
 Sedation / Twilight
 Dental (Inferior alveolar nerve)
 Neuroleptanalgesic anesthesia
 Nerve block

History of anesthesia 
 History of general anesthesia
 History of neuraxial anesthesia
 History of tracheal intubation

Plants/animals 
 Aconite
 Castoreum
 cannabis
 Coca
 Deadly nightshade
 Henbane
 Lactucarium
 Mandrake
 Metel nut
 Opium
 Poison hemlock
 Saussurea
 Toloatzin
 Willow

People 
 Abulcasis
 Avenzoar
 Avicenna
 Celsus
 Dioscorides
 Galen
 Hippocrates
 Rhazes
 Sabuncuoğlu
 Sushrutha
 Theophrastus
 Zhang

Compounds 
 Aconitine
 Δ9-THC
 Atropine
 Cocaine
 Coniine
 Hyoscyamine
 Morphine
 Salicylate
 Scopolamine

General anesthetic drugs 

 General anaesthetic
 Benzodiazepine
 Etomidate
 FlyNap
 Infiltration analgesia
 Inhalational anaesthetic
 Ketamine
 Local anesthetic
 Methohexital
 Midazolam
 Neuraxial blockade
 Propofol
 Thiopental
 Thiopentone

Anesthetic techniques 
 Airway management
 Anesthesia provision in the US
 Capnography
 Concentration effect
 Dogliotti's principle
 Drug-induced amnesia
 Fink effect
 Intraoperative neurophysiological monitoring
 Laryngoscopy
 Nerve block

Complications 

 Agitated emergence
 Allergic reactions
 Anesthesia awareness
 Local anesthetic toxicity
 Malignant hyperthermia 
 Perioperative mortality
 Postanesthetic shivering
 Postoperative nausea and vomiting
 Postoperative residual curarization

Measurements 
 ASA physical status classification system
 Baricity
 Bispectral index
 Direct Fick method
 Entropy monitoring
 Fick principle
 Goldman index
 Guedel's classification
 Mallampati score
 Minimum alveolar concentration
 Neuromuscular monitoring

Instruments used in anesthesiology 
Instruments used in anesthesiology
 Anaesthetic machine
 Anesthesia cart
 Boyle's machine
 Double-lumen endobronchial tube
 Gas cylinder
 Laryngeal mask airway
 Medical monitor
 Odom's indicator
 Relative analgesia machine
 Tracheal tube
 Vaporiser

Fields of study 

 Cardiothoracic
 Geriatric
 Oral sedation dentistry

Professions 

 Anesthesiologist
 Anesthesiologist assistant
 Nurse anesthetist
 Certified Anesthesia Technician
 Certified Anesthesia Technologist
 Anaesthetic technician

Organizations 

 American Association of Nurse Anesthetists 
 American Society of Anesthesia Technologists & Technicians
 American Society of Anesthesiologists
 Anaesthesia Trauma and Critical Care
 Association of Anaesthetists of Great Britain and Ireland
 Association of Veterinary Anaesthetists
 Australian and New Zealand College of Anaesthetists
 Australian Society of Anaesthetists
 International Anesthesia Research Society

Anesthesia publications 

 Anesthesia & Analgesia
 Anesthesiology'
 British Journal of Anaesthesia

Persons influential in anesthesia 

 August Bier
 Crawford Long
 William T. G. Morton
 James Young Simpson
 Horace Wells

References

External links 

 American Association of Nurse Anesthetists
 American Society of Anesthesiologists
 American Academy of Anesthesiologist Assistants
 AnaesthesiaUK

 
Anesthesia
Anesthesia